is an anime television series produced by Gonzo. The story centres on Eiji Shigure who is searching for his missing sister Ayaka. This leads him to the castle of Klein Sandman, and there he joins the fight against the invading mechanical lifeforms, the Zeravire.

Gravion aired in Japan every Monday from October 7, 2002 to December 16, 2002 and ran for 13 episodes. Episodes 9 and 10, and 11 and 12 were shown together on the same night, leading to just an 11-week run.

The opening song for Gravion was "Nageki no Rosario" by JAM Project, the ending song was "WISH" by YURIA. Whenever Gravion assembled the song "Gasshin! God Gravion!" by JAM Project would play.

Volume 1 of Gravion was released on DVD in the United States by ADV Films on May 25, 2004, and came with a box for all three volumes. Volume 2 was released on July 20, 2004, Volume 3 was released on September 14, 2004   with a complete collection consisting of all three volumes released on January 17, 2006.

, was the followup to the original series, also produced by Gonzo. The series answered the questions generated from the first series. 

Gravion Zwei aired from January 8 to March 25 in Japan, running for twelve additional episodes.

The opening song for Gravion Zwei was "Kurenai no Kiba" by JAM Project, the ending song was "La♪La♪Bye" by HoneyBee. Whenever Gravion assembled the song "Enno Gasshin! Soul Gravion!" by JAM Project would play.

Volume 1 of Gravion Zwei was released on DVD in the United States by ADV Films on March 8, 2005 and came with a box for all three volumes. Volume 2 was released on May 3, 2005. Volume 3 was released on July 5, 2005. A complete collection was released on July 25, 2006. On March 31, 2009 ADV released the Gravion Complete Collection, containing all episodes from Gravion and Gravion Zwei in one box.

Both Gravion and Gravion Zwei were created and directed by Masami Ōbari.

Gravion

Gravion Zwei

References

External links
Official Website

Lists of anime episodes